Tomorrow is the second studio album by Jamaican-American singer Sean Kingston. The album was released on September 7, 2009. Despite "Fire Burning" being a huge summer hit in 2009, the album only peaked at #37 on the U.S. Billboard 200 albums chart with only 13,000 copies sold in the first week of release. It dropped out of the top 40 the next week, falling 50 spots to #87.

Background and composition 
Tomorrows sound is significantly different from the sound of Kingston's debut album. In this new LP, he explores sounds of 1990s eurodance and electropop, using instruments like Roland 808 drum machine, Auto-Tune and synthesizers while adding his signature reggae and pop music. Tomorrow also melds together genres of punk rock and soft rock, shown in 
"Shoulda Let Go" featuring American rock band Good Charlotte. Influences of  nu-disco, Euro disco and electropop show on "Fire Burning", "Face Drop", and "My Girlfriend". The song "War" was originally supposed to feature rap artist Lil Wayne, but he was taken out of the song on the final version.

Critical reception 

David Jeffries of AllMusic favored songs "Fire Burning", "Face Drop", "My Girlfriend", "Shoulda Let U Go", and "Ice Cream Girl" and feels ""Tomorrow" proves Kingston can provide a whole album's worth of pool-side entertainment even without the 'Beautiful Girls'-sized single." Jon Dolan of Rolling Stone said "For the most part--despite Auto-Tuned slow songs--Kingston's mix of young-adult desire and disco heat shows he can cross over in unexpected directions." Simon Vozick-Levinson of Entertainment Weekly felt that "Although he's got plenty of hooks, personality is in much shorter supply". While some of his reviews are positive, others feel his album lacks novelty and interest. Jason Richards of Now Magazine said that although he is a good singer-songwriter, his album lacks novelty and feels irritating.  Apparently to Sarah Rodman of The Boston Globe, Kingston's collections of "silly lyrics and robotic tempos of Sean Kingston’s sophomore album slide if it were mid-July and we were in the mood for Euro-disco/reggae mash-ups, and straight-up electro-pop." Bill Lamb of About.com:
It's abundantly clear on Tomorrow that Sean Kingston plans to stick around for awhile. He demonstrates he can play well with other artists on the bouncy "Shoulda Let Go" which is co-produced by Drum Up (LaMar Seymour, LaNelle Seymour) for Drum Up Digital and featuring a rock chorus from Good Charlotte and a rhythmic vocal workout with Wyclef Jean on "Ice Cream Girl." At least half of the songs here could be pop hit singles and fit easily into contemporary pop radio playlists. Sean Kingston may want to consider stripping his sound down a bit more, but Tomorrow is far from an unpleasant listening experience. Sean Kingston has successfully delivered the goods he has to offer a second time around.

Track listing

Singles
 "Fire Burning" was the first official single from the album, released on April 24, 2009. It peaked at #5 on the Billboard Hot 100, becoming the most successful single from the album.
 "Face Drop" was the second official single from the album. It was released to radio stations on August 18, 2009 and iTunes on September 1, 2009. Lyrically, "Face Drop" is plea to not judge by appearance. It peaked at #61 on the Billboard Hot 100, which was of moderate success compared to Kingston's previous hits.

Promotional singles
iTunes released promotional singles from the album as part of "Countdown to Tomorrow". All singles received the same animated artwork, each with a different color background.

 "My Girlfriend" was the first promo single and was released digitally on July 28, 2009.
 "Wrap U Around Me" was the second promo single and was released digitally on August 4, 2009.
 "Tomorrow" was the third promo single and was released digitally on August 11, 2009.
 "Island Queen" was the fourth promo single and was released digitally on August 18, 2009.
 "War" was the fifth promo single and was released digitally on August 25, 2009. Originally "War" featured rapper Lil Wayne, but this version was not included on the album.
 "Face Drop" was the sixth promo single and was released digitally on September 1, 2009. It was also released as the second official single from the album, and it was sent to radio on August 18, 2009.

References

External links
 Sean Kingston interview by Pete Lewis, 'Blues & Soul' August 2009

2009 albums
Sean Kingston albums
Albums produced by Akon
Albums produced by DJ Frank E
Albums produced by J. R. Rotem
Albums produced by Detail (record producer)
Albums produced by RedOne
Albums produced by the Smeezingtons
Epic Records albums
Albums produced by Fernando Garibay